Arcitalitrus sylvaticus, known generally as the lawn shrimp or landhopper, is a species of beach hopper in the family Talitridae. It was first described in 1879 by William Aitcheson Haswell as Talitrus sylvaticus.

It is found in Australia and nearby areas of the Pacific but has been introduced to other places, like California, New Zealand, the British Isles, North Carolina and Florida. The first recorded instance in California was in 1967.

They die in dry conditions and drown if it is too wet. In California, especially, they are a sign of overwatering, as they will leave their homes to avoid drowning.

References

Amphipoda
Articles created by Qbugbot
Crustaceans described in 1879
Taxa named by William Aitcheson Haswell